Dashtop mobile equipment refers to wireless mobile devices mounted on the vehicle dashboard. Dashtop mobile equipment (DME) includes satellite radios, GPS navigation, OnStar, mobile TV, HD radio, vehicle tracking system, MVEDR and Broadband Wireless Access (BWA) devices. Currently, the dashtop mobile devices are mostly satellite-based wireless technology. Except for OnStar and BWA devices, most of them are in the stage of passive one-way communications equipment.

However, fast-evolving mobile technology is on the threshold of turning dashtop mobile equipment into full-duplex multimedia gadgetry on the strength of fast-growing broadband infrastructure, including expanding WiMAX networks worldwide. of electronic vehicle gadgetry, with growing indications that convergence into an all-in-one dashtop mobile device is an ultimate destination.

History
Since the commercial debut of cellular phones in the early 1990s, Palm Inc took the lead in developing a generation of palmtop handheld personal computers that worked like an electronic personal organizer. Palmtops turned into Personal Digital Assistants (PDAs) with mobile phone functions.

As of 2007, PDA phones are preferred by some, due mainly to wider screens and easier texting plus mobile multimedia functions, such as audio video playback, mobile web and mobile TV. Apple's iPhone made a debut in late June 2007, featuring keypadless touchscreens with multi-touch.

Mobile issues
Mobile technology is evolving fast, and in the 2007 NEXTcomm opening keynote in Chicago, Ed Zander, then CEO of Motorola, noted "Today it's about fast, affordable broadband Internet. Tomorrow I believe it's about wireless and broadband media platforms. And we as an industry have to work together, software and platforms, the content players and the carriers, as well as the equipment suppliers like ourselves, to bring this vision of this broadband media platform to a reality."

At the same NXTcomm conference, Verizon Chairman and CEO Ivan Seidenberg also proclaimed, "We have barely begun to imagine all the ways that rich graphics, two-way broadband and virtual reality will transform medicine, education and creative industries. This surge in visual, interactive content – delivered to any screen, anytime, anywhere – has changed our industry forever."

The recall of lithium ion battery for laptops in 2006, and the emerging safety issue concerning portable handheld devices, like iPOD.

Harnessing vehicle traffic
 Freedom from battery life concerns due to a possible shift to car battery
 Driving safety associated with driver focus and driver distraction
 Transition from voice-intensive cellular technology to media-intensive broadband technology
 Open access plans adopted for the Federal Communications Commission's 700 MHz Airwave Auctions held for early 2008 in USA and the subsequent openness of the controversial C Block to be realized by Verizon Wireless, the successful bidder

Academic research
Scientific research and market-based R&D endeavors are focused on harnessing vehicle traffic and wireless connections. MIT embarked on Real Time Rome, a project that is designed to create real-time maps of people moving around a city through mobile phone networks with the aim of beating traffic congestion. "Real Time Rome might also help with the better allocation of transport resources."

UCLA researchers are working on a project to encourage installation of vehicle-to-vehicle mobile computer networks to ensure driving safety and deal with congestions.

Challenges for automakers
Automakers challenges include:
how to improve fuel efficiency in keeping with green technology
how to enhance driving safety, mainly based on electronic gadgets
how to adapt to fast-evolving mobile broadband technology to stay ahead of competition.
Topping the list of dashtop gadgetry issues are MP3 players, video streaming and playback, mega-bit-per-second downloads of multimedia, mobile TV formats, dashtop interfaces either for mobile phones or smartphones, choices of 4G technologies between LTE, UMB and mobile WiMAX.

Scope of applications

Vehicular mobility to lure more BWA equipment and  applications
Scope of applications, either on lab benches or in implementation stages, can be summarized as below:

 Just In Time (JIT) eCommerce on the go
 mobile banking
 mobile advertising
 mobile marketing
 location-based services (LBS)
 mobile ticketing & remote check-in processes for transport hubs, ballparks and expos (Compare with "cellphone use as paperless boarding pass")
 mass surveillance at transportation hubs, targeted at both passengers and motorists
 distance mobile payment of parking fees, tolls, bills ( in terms of range and real-time sync, it differs from proximity-based mobile payments, such as contactless payment, Near Field Communication (NFC), smartcards, RFID tags, and online payments like PayPal and Google Checkout )
 mobile entertainment, including paid downloading of music, movies, video games and playback functions. Microsoft is showcasing such features in its Windows Mobile for Automotive.
 Mobile vehicle-to-vehicle driving safety monitoring

See also 
 Automotive design

References

External links
MIT Real Time Rome project
Mobile Commerce Times

Automotive accessories